The NZR P class was a class of two ST locomotives built to work on the government-owned national rail network of New Zealand in 1876. They were initially ordered by the Otago Provincial Council, but they were soon incorporated into the national locomotive fleet when the provinces were abolished.  Other examples of the P class were built for industrial service and never came under the ownership of the New Zealand Railways Department, though one worked on the Kaitangata Line.

History 
The two P class locomotives owned by the Railways Department were known as Kiwi and Weka and they soon passed to the ownership of others, allowing the P classification to be used again in 1885.  Weka was the first to leave the ownership of the Railways Department in 1882, when it was acquired by the Wellington and Manawatu Railway Company, who used it for construction and maintenance purposes until 1898. It then came into the possession of the Manawatu County Council's Sanson Tramway, who operated it until 1922, when it passed into the ownership of Mangawhero Sawmilling Co at Karioi  and was ultimately scrapped in 1932.  Kiwi left the Railways Department's ownership a few years after Weka, just before the arrival of the second P class in 1885.  It worked for a number of sawmilling companies throughout the North Island for over half a century, but was derelict in 1956.

See also
 NZR A class (1873)
 NZR C class (1873)
 NZR D class (1874)
 NZR P class (1885)
 Locomotives of New Zealand

References

Citations

Bibliography

External links
History of some P class members
New Zealand Railways steam locomotives - P class

P class
0-6-0ST locomotives
Scrapped locomotives
Railway locomotives introduced in 1876
3 ft 6 in gauge locomotives of New Zealand